David Beswick (18 June 1910 – 1991) was an English footballer who played in the Football League for Stoke City.

Career
Beswick was born in Stoke-on-Trent and played for Mount Pleasant before joining Stoke City in 1929. He provided back up to Dick Williams, Norman Lewis and Roy John during a four-year spell at the Victoria Ground. He played once in 1929–30 six times in 1930–31 and twice in 1932–33 before leaving for Walsall. He made just one appearance for the "Saddlers" which came in the Third Division North Cup.

Career statistics
Source:

References

English footballers
Stoke City F.C. players
Walsall F.C. players
English Football League players
1910 births
1991 deaths
Association football goalkeepers